Myrtle Township is an inactive township in Oregon County, in the U.S. state of Missouri.

Myrtle Township took its name from the community of Myrtle, Missouri.

References

Townships in Missouri
Townships in Oregon County, Missouri